Ana Gutiérrez can refer to:

 Ana Gutiérrez (footballer)
 Ana Gutiérrez (runner)
 Ana Gutiérrez (javelin thrower)
 Ana Sol Gutierrez, politician